Elha Mae Fronda Nympha (born April 16, 2004) is a Filipino singer who won the second season of The Voice Kids in 2015. She started singing at the age of 3 and started joining a school competition at the age of 7, where she won a rotary competition on Amaranth on February 18, 2014. At the age of 9, she auditioned for the first season of The Voice Kids but did not make it. In 2015, she tried her fate again and auditioned for the second season, which she won.

Nympha won a recording contract with MCA Music Inc. (Philippines), a Universal Music Group company in 2015, with her self-titled studio album, Elha, released on October 7, 2016, with the carrier singles "Susunduin", "Emotions", and "Love on Top".

Nympha was a member of the all-female vocal group New Gen Divas together with Janine Berdin, Sheena Belarmino and Fana.

Early life
She lived at Kamuning, near EDSA, GMA Building and MRT-3 Kamuning station. She was selling banana cue to support herself and her family. Her mother, Lucy noticed that Elha has a talent for singing.

Career

2015: The Voice Kids
On the blind auditions, she performed Mariah Carey's "Vision of Love". Coach Bamboo Mañalac pressed the button for her. She advanced to the sing-off round by winning the battles against Kate Campo and Paul Abellana. They sang "Your Love" by Alamid. She was picked until the live shows, and she was called 2nd for the Top 4 together with Reynan, Esang and Sassa. On her performance in the finale, Nympha received at least 42.16% of the votes.

2016–present: Post-The Voice Kids
In 2016, she released her first album. In December 2016 she was a guest performer in the grand final of The Voice Kids Indonesia. Then in 2017, she took part in Your Face Sounds Familiar: Kids (season 1). Elha appeared during the second season of Steve Harvey's Little Big Shots where she performed Sia's "Chandelier". She also participated at the French version of Little Big Shots named Little Big Stars presented by Cyril Hanouna where she covered the same song. In 2019, a girl group was formed called J.E.Z. where Nympha is a member of along with Janine Berdin and Zephanie. The group would take a hiatus in March 2020, but would reform in 2021 with the addition of Sheena Belarmino as a new member of the group and it would be rebranded to New Gen Divas. The reformed group debuted in April 2021, following Zephanie's return to ASAP, with Elha representing the color blue in the said group.

In July 2022, Nympha officially joins UMG Philippines' newest label Republic Records Philippines.

Discography

Filmography

Television

Accolades

References

External links

Living people
Star Magic
Filipino child singers
Participants in Philippine reality television series
Filipino television personalities
ABS-CBN personalities
The Voice Kids (Philippine TV series) contestants
2004 births
21st-century Filipino women singers
People from Quezon City
Singers from Metro Manila